Professor Saki Ruth Dockrill, née Saki Kimura (14 December 1952 – 8 August 2009) was a Japanese-British historian of modern international affairs, and Professor at King's College London.

Born in Kyoto, she obtained an LLM from Kyoto University in 1976, a Masters in International Relations from the University of Sussex in 1982, and then joined the Department of War Studies at King's College London where she did her PhD on West Germany and its relationship with NATO. Her thesis was later published as Britain's Policy for West German Rearmament, 1950-1955. She then moved to be one of the first Olin Fellows at Yale University for the 1988–89 year, where she studied especially resources in the Eisenhower Presidential Library.

Dockrill returned to Britain and King's College London, as MacArthur Fellow in and lecturer from 1992, as senior lecturer from 1997, and from April 2003, as professor of Contemporary History and International Security.

Dockrill married Michael Dockrill c. 1985. She gained British citizenship in 1993. She died of cancer in 2009.

Bibliography

Edited

References

External links 
 The Saki Ruth Dockrill memorial lecture series at KCL
 The Saki Ruth Dockrill memorial prize at GWU

1952 births
2009 deaths
British women historians
British people of Japanese descent
Japanese women historians
Alumni of the University of Sussex
Alumni of King's College London
Kyoto University alumni
Yale University alumni